John Pomeroy (1724 – 10 June 1790) was an Irish general, the younger brother of Arthur Pomeroy, 1st Viscount Harberton.

Career
He was elected to the Irish House of Commons as Member of Parliament for Carrick in 1755 and for Trim in May 1761.

On 9 March 1762 he was promoted from Lieutenant-Colonel to Colonel of Foot, and later to Major-General. He served in North America, including at the Battle of Bunker Hill. He was appointed to the Privy Council of Ireland on 28 May 1777 and promoted to Lieutenant-General on 6 September 1777.

In 1783 he was re-elected for Trim alongside William Wellesley, and in May 1790 alongside Arthur Wellesley.

Death and succession
On his death later that year, he was succeeded as MP for Trim by Clotworthy Taylor, and as Colonel of the 64th Regiment of Foot by Major-General John Leland.

References

1724 births
1790 deaths
Irish MPs 1727–1760
Irish MPs 1761–1768
Irish MPs 1769–1776
Irish MPs 1776–1783
Irish MPs 1790–1797
British Army generals
Members of the Privy Council of Ireland
Members of the Parliament of Ireland (pre-1801) for County Leitrim constituencies
Members of the Parliament of Ireland (pre-1801) for County Meath constituencies